Aleksandr Aleksandrovich Boloshev (12 March 1947, Elektrogorsk, Moscow Oblast, USSR – 16 July 2010, Volgograd, Russia) was a Soviet and Russian basketball player who won gold with the Soviet basketball team in Basketball at the 1972 Summer Olympics. He trained at Dynamo in Moscow and played for Dynamo Moscow (1969–1980).

References

1947 births
2010 deaths
People from Moscow Oblast
Olympic basketball players of the Soviet Union
Basketball players at the 1972 Summer Olympics
BC Dynamo Moscow players
Soviet men's basketball players
1974 FIBA World Championship players
1978 FIBA World Championship players
Olympic gold medalists for the Soviet Union
FIBA EuroBasket-winning players
Olympic medalists in basketball
Medalists at the 1972 Summer Olympics
FIBA World Championship-winning players
Power forwards (basketball)
Sportspeople from Moscow Oblast